Hojo Moritoki (1295–1333) was the last Shikken (Regent) of the Kamakura shogunate and the last regent of the Hōjō clan.

References 

1295 births
1333 deaths
Hōjō clan
People of Kamakura-period Japan